The Testimony (Italian: Il testimone) is 1946 Italian crime film directed by Pietro Germi and starring Roldano Lupi, Marina Berti and Ernesto Almirante.  It is one of several films regarded as an antecedent of the later giallo thrillers.

The film was made at the Cines Studios in Rome. The sets were designed by the art director Salvo D'Angelo.

Cast
 Roldano Lupi as Pietro Scotti  
 Marina Berti as Linda 
 Ernesto Almirante as Giuseppe Marchi, il testimone  
 Sandro Ruffini as L'avvocato difensore  
 Cesare Fantoni as Il padrone dell' osteria  
 Arnoldo Foà as L'impiegato dell' anagrafe  
 Dino Maronetto as Andrea, il condanato 
 Marcella Melnati as La padrone di casa  
 Alfredo Salvatori 
 Petr Sharov as Il pubblico ministero 
 Pietro Fumelli 
 Angelo Calabrese 
 Vittorio Cottafavi
 Giovanni Petrucci

References

Bibliography 
 Moliterno, Gino. A to Z of Italian Cinema. Scarecrow Press, 2009.

External links 

1946 films
Italian crime films
1946 crime films
1940s Italian-language films
Films directed by Pietro Germi
Films with screenplays by Cesare Zavattini
Cines Studios films
Italian black-and-white films
Films scored by Enzo Masetti
1940s Italian films